Tomasz Bekas (born 17 June 1975) is a Polish retired professional footballer who played as a central midfielder and current head coach of Unia Swarzędz.

References

External links
 

1975 births
Living people
Footballers from Poznań
Polish footballers
Association football midfielders
Ekstraklasa players
I liga players
II liga players
III liga players
Lechia Zielona Góra players
Obra Kościan players
Lech Poznań players
Lech Poznań II players
Aluminium Konin players
Kujawiak Włocławek players
Zawisza Bydgoszcz players
Unia Janikowo players
Warta Poznań players
Wisła Płock players
Polonia Środa Wielkopolska players
Polish football managers
Warta Poznań managers